Wojciech Samotij is a Polish mathematician who works in combinatorics, additive number theory, Ramsey theory  and graph theory.

Education and career

He studied at the University of Wrocław where in 2007 he obtained his Master of Science degrees in mathematics and computer science. He received his PhD in 2011 at University of Illinois at Urbana-Champaign on the basis of his dissertation titled Extremal Problems In Pseudo-random Graphs And Asymptotic Enumeration and written under the supervision of József Balogh. Between 2010 and 2014, he was a fellow of the Trinity College, Cambridge at the University of Cambridge. Currently, he is an associate professor at Tel Aviv University. He published his scientific work in such journals as Random Structures & Algorithms, Journal of the American Mathematical Society, or Israel Journal of Mathematics.

He received the 2013 Kuratowski Prize, the 2013 European Prize in Combinatorics and the 2016 George Pólya Prize.

Selected publications
 with József Balogh, Robert Morris, and Lutz Warnke: 
 with József Balogh and Robert Morris: 
 with Noga Alon, József Balogh, and Robert Morris: 
 with Noga Alon, József Balogh, and Robert Morris: 
 with Ron Peled: 
 with József Balogh:

See also
List of Polish mathematicians
combinatorics
Ramsey theory

References

Living people
Polish academics
Polish mathematicians
Combinatorialists
Academic staff of Tel Aviv University
Year of birth missing (living people)
University of Wrocław alumni
Fellows of Trinity College, Cambridge
Erdős Prize recipients